The Murfreesboro Musicians were a franchise of the now-defunct World Basketball Association that played in Murfreesboro, Tennessee.

External links
Official Website

World Basketball Association teams
Basketball teams in Tennessee
Murfreesboro, Tennessee
2006 establishments in Tennessee
Basketball teams established in 2006